Pilodeudorix is a genus of butterflies in the family Lycaenidae. They are found in the Afrotropical realm.

Species
Pilodeudorix anetia (Hulstaert, 1924)
Pilodeudorix angelita (Suffert, 1904)
Pilodeudorix ankoleensis (Stempffer, 1953)
Pilodeudorix aruma (Hewitson, 1873)
Pilodeudorix aucta (Karsch, 1895)
Pilodeudorix aurivilliusi (Stempffer, 1954)
Pilodeudorix azurea (Stempffer, 1964)
Pilodeudorix baginei (Collins & Larsen, 1991)
Pilodeudorix bemba (Neave, 1910)
Pilodeudorix caerulea (Druce, 1890)
Pilodeudorix camerona (Plötz, 1880)
Pilodeudorix canescens (Joicey & Talbot, 1921)
Pilodeudorix catalla (Karsch, 1895)
Pilodeudorix catori (Bethune-Baker, 1903)
Pilodeudorix congoana (Schultze & Aurivillius, 1923)
Pilodeudorix corruscans (Aurivillius, 1898)
Pilodeudorix deritas (Hewitson, 1874)
Pilodeudorix diyllus (Hewitson, 1878)
Pilodeudorix ducarmei (Collins & Larsen, 1998)
Pilodeudorix elealodes (Bethune-Baker, 1908)
Pilodeudorix fumata (Stempffer, 1954)
Pilodeudorix hamidou Libert, 2004
Pilodeudorix hugoi Libert, 2004
Pilodeudorix infuscata (Stempffer, 1964)
Pilodeudorix kafuensis (Neave, 1910)
Pilodeudorix kallipygos (Birket-Smith, 1960)
Pilodeudorix kedassa (Druce, 1910)
Pilodeudorix kiellandi (Congdon & Collins, 1998)
Pilodeudorix kohli (Aurivillius, 1921)
Pilodeudorix laticlavia (Clench, 1965)
Pilodeudorix leonina (Bethune-Baker, 1904)
Pilodeudorix mera (Hewitson, 1873)
Pilodeudorix mimeta (Karsch, 1895)
Pilodeudorix nirmo (Clench, 1965)
Pilodeudorix nyanzana (Stempffer, 1957)
Pilodeudorix obscurata (Trimen, 1891)
Pilodeudorix otraeda (Hewitson, 1863)
Pilodeudorix pasteon (Druce, 1910)
Pilodeudorix pseudoderitas (Stempffer, 1964)
Pilodeudorix rodgersi Kielland, 1985
Pilodeudorix sadeska (Clench, 1965)
Pilodeudorix tenuivittata (Stempffer, 1951)
Pilodeudorix ula (Karsch, 1895)
Pilodeudorix violetta (Aurivillius, 1898)
Pilodeudorix virgata (Druce, 1891)
Pilodeudorix zela (Hewitson, 1869)
Pilodeudorix zeloides (Butler, 1901)
Pilodeudorix zelomina (Rebel, 1914)

External links
"Pilodeudorix Druce, 1891" at Markku Savela's Lepidoptera and Some Other Life Forms

Deudorigini
Lycaenidae genera
Taxa named by Hamilton Herbert Druce